Zond 4, part of the Soviet Zond program and an uncrewed version of Soyuz 7K-L1 crewed Moon-flyby spacecraft, was one of the first Soviet experiments towards crewed circumlunar spaceflight. It was launched to test the spaceworthiness of the new capsule and to gather data about flights in circumterrestrial space. It was the first Soviet spacecraft to possess a computer, the 34 kg Argon 11.

The spacecraft was successfully launched by a Proton D-1e on 2 March 1968 into a 400,000 km apogee orbit 180 degrees away from the Moon. It was launched away from the Moon probably to avoid trajectory complications with lunar gravity. However, on re-entry the L1's guidance system failed. It hit the atmosphere precisely at the calculated time, but was not guided to generate lift and fly out of the atmosphere again. A ballistic re-entry would mean no recovery on Soviet soil, so the APO destruct system automatically blew up the capsule at 10 to 15 km altitude, 180–200 km off the African coast at Guinea.

The Zond 4 flight was in some ways similar to the American Apollo 4 and 6 missions as they were uncrewed test flights in highly elliptical Earth orbits.

References

External links

 Astronautix.com Information on Lunar L1 program, including Zond 4

Zond program
Spacecraft launched in 1968
1968 in the Soviet Union